Bob Yudin (born April 1939) is a former chairman of the Bergen County, New Jersey Republican Party.

Personal and early life 
Yudin grew up in Belleville, where his father owned a paint store, and moved to Wyckoff in 1968. He served in the Navy as a lieutenant until age 26 in 1967. In 1972 Yudin opened a family business, Yudin's Discount Appliances, that, as of 2022, has locations in Wyckoff and Passaic.

Political career 
In 1967 Yudin ran unsuccessfully for the New Jersey Assembly as an Essex County Republican. In the 1970s he managed congressional and legislative campaigns, and later went on to serve two terms on the Wyckoff Board of Education and make three unsuccessful runs for the position of Bergen County freeholder.

On June 17, 2008 Yudin won the Bergen County Republican Party chairmanship, with 57% of the vote over incumbent chairman Robert Ortiz's 43%.

In 2009 Yudin was named by Governor-elect Chris Christie to serve on a transition subcommittee responsible for reviewing the operations of the New Jersey Department of Labor and Workforce Development.

In 2016 Yudin ran for reelection as BCRO chairman, but lost to former New Jersey Assemblyman Paul DiGaetano amidst complaints that Yudin was responsible for the Republicans' recent electoral losses in county government.

In 2021 Yudin launched an unsuccessful write-in campaign against Republican Wyckoff Township Committeeman Tom Madigan.

References

Living people
1939 births
People from Belleville, New Jersey
People from Wyckoff, New Jersey
New Jersey Republicans